Mark Oliver Pritzen (born 11 August 1999) is a South African cyclist, who currently rides for UCI Continental team .

Major results
2019
 1st  Overall Tour of Good Hope
1st  Youth classification
1st Stages 3 (TTT) & 5
2020
 2nd Time trial, National Under-23 Road Championships
2021
 1st  Road race, National Road Championships
 1st  Time trial, National Under-23 Road Championships
2022
 3rd Road race, National Road Championships
2023
 1st  Mountains classification, Tour du Rwanda

References

External links

1999 births
Living people
South African male cyclists
White South African people